Levi Steinhauer (born January 19, 1991) is a Canadian football fullback for the Edmonton Eskimos of the Canadian Football League (CFL). He was drafted 40th overall by the Saskatchewan Roughriders in the 2013 CFL Draft and signed with the team on May 30, 2013. Steinhauer played college football for the Saskatchewan Huskies. On November 10, 2015, Steinhauer was resigned for the 2016 CFL season. He was released by the Roughriders on February 1, 2017.

References

External links
Saskatchewan Roughriders bio

1991 births
Living people
Players of Canadian football from Saskatchewan
Canadian football defensive linemen
Saskatchewan Huskies football players
Saskatchewan Roughriders players
Edmonton Elks players
Sportspeople from Moose Jaw